The Connecticut River Valley Killer is the name given to an unidentified American serial killer believed to be responsible for a series of stabbing murders mostly in and around Claremont, New Hampshire and the Connecticut River Valley, primarily in the 1980s.

Background and investigation
In the mid 1980s, three young women disappeared around Claremont. In 1985 and 1986, the skeletal remains of two of the women were recovered within a thousand feet of each other in a wooded area in Kelleyville, New Hampshire. The condition of the remains made the cause of death difficult to determine, but certain factors pointed to multiple stab wounds. Between the recovery of the first and second bodies, a 36-year-old woman was stabbed to death in a frenzied attack inside her home in Saxtons River, Vermont. Ten days later, the remains of the third missing woman were found; an autopsy again revealed evidence of multiple stab wounds.

At this point, investigators began examining prior homicides in the area and found two previous cases, in 1978 and 1981, that further reinforced the presence of a burgeoning serial killer. At the peak of the investigation, and after additional homicides and one non-fatal attack, investigators noted similarities in modus operandi, often-used dump sites, and specific wound patterns that linked many of the murders, suggesting a common perpetrator.

Murders
On October 24, 1978, 27-year-old Catherine “Cathy” Millican left work and went to the Chandler Brook Wetland Preserve in New London, New Hampshire where she was photographing birds. The next day, her body, with at least twenty-nine stab wounds, was found only yards away from where she was last seen. On July 25, 1981, 37-year-old Mary Elizabeth Critchley, a student from the University of Vermont, disappeared near Interstate 91 at the Massachusetts-Vermont border, where she had been hitchhiking to Waterbury, Vermont. She was last seen by a friend who dropped her off near exit 13 of the Massachusetts Turnpike. On August 9, her body was found in a wooded area off Unity Stage Road in Unity, New Hampshire, about eighty miles from where she was last seen. Owing to the condition of the body, the medical examiner was unable to determine a cause of death.

17-year-old nurse's aide and high school student Bernice Courtemanche was last seen by her boyfriend's mother in Claremont on May 30, 1984. She was thought to have set out to see her boyfriend in Newport by hitchhiking along New Hampshire Route 12. She did not reach her destination and was subsequently reported missing. On April 19, 1986, a fisherman happened upon Courtemanche's remains near the Sugar River in Newport, New Hampshire. Forensic examination uncovered evidence of knife wounds to the chest and an injury to the head. Her throat had been slit.

On July 22, 1984, 26-year-old Ellen Ruth Fried—supervising nurse at Valley Regional Hospital—made a late-night stop at around 2 a.m. to use a payphone at Leo's Market in Claremont. Fried spoke with her sister for approximately an hour when she suddenly remarked on a strange car she had observed driving back and forth in the vicinity circling around the parking lot. She stepped away from the phone briefly to make sure her car's engine would start and then returned. After speaking for a few minutes longer, Fried concluded the call. The next day, Fried failed to report to work and her car was found abandoned on Jarvis Road, a few miles away from the market where she used the payphone. Fried's skeletal remains were found in an isolated wooded area near the banks of the Sugar River in Kelleyville, eight miles outside of Claremont, on September 19, 1985. Postmortem examination revealed evidence of multiple stab wounds and probable sexual assault.

On July 10, 1985, 27-year-old single mother Eva Marie Morse was seen hitchhiking near the border of Claremont and Charlestown, New Hampshire, on Route 12. This is the last time anyone would see Morse alive, and she too was reported missing. Postmortem examination found evidence of knife wounds to Morse's chest and neck. 

On April 15, 1986, 36-year-old Lynda Moore was doing yard work alone outside her home in Saxtons River, Vermont near Route 121 at 2 p.m. while her husband was at work. That evening, her husband returned home an hour after she was last seen to find his wife's dead body in the living room, bearing twenty-five knife wounds. The crime scene suggested a fierce struggle had taken place. There were no signs of forced entry or ransacking. Numerous witnesses reported having seen a slightly stocky, dark-haired man with a blue knapsack lingering near Moore's home the day of the murder. The man was thought to be between 20 and 25-years-old, clean shaven, with a somewhat round face, and wearing dark-rimmed glasses. The following year, a composite sketch was released.

On January 10, 1987, 38-year-old nurse Barbara Agnew was returning from a skiing outing with friends in Stratton, Vermont on Stratton Mountain. At around 10 p.m., she was last seen heading to her home in Norwich. That evening, a snowplow driver encountered her green BMW at a northbound I-91 rest stop in Hartford, Vermont. The door was cracked and there was blood on the steering wheel and back seat. Some of her bloodstained belongings were found in a nearby dumpster. On March 28, 1987, Agnew's body was found near an apple tree on Advent Hill Road in a wooded area in Hartland, Vermont. It was twelve miles from the rest area. She had been stabbed repeatedly in the neck and chest. She had several defense wounds, as well as a "disabling" wound. There was a heavy snowstorm in the area during the night of Agnew's disappearance, and she was a mere ten miles from her home. Her reasons for pulling into the rest stop have puzzled investigators.

Survivor
The killings had apparently stopped when, late in the evening on August 6, 1988, 22-year-old Jane Boroski, seven months pregnant, was returning from a county fair in Keene, New Hampshire, when she stopped at a closed convenience store in West Swanzey to purchase soda from a vending machine. Boroski had returned to her car when she took notice of a Jeep Wagoneer parked next to her. Through her rear-view mirror, Boroski then saw the driver of the vehicle walking around the back of her vehicle. 

He then approached her open window and asked her if the payphone was working, at which time he immediately grabbed her and pulled her from the vehicle. Boroski struggled, and the man accused her of beating up his girlfriend and asked if she had Massachusetts plates on her car. Boroski responded that she had New Hampshire plates, but this did not deter her attacker, who proceeded to stab her 27 times before driving away and leaving her to die.

Boroski managed to return to her car and drive on New Hampshire Route 32 toward a friend's house for help. As she neared the house, she noticed a vehicle driving in front of her and realized that it was her attacker's Jeep. Boroski finally reached her friend's home at which the occupants immediately came to her aid. Her attacker apparently performed a U-turn and slowly passed by the house as Boroski was tended to before speeding away into the night.

Boroski was treated at the hospital, where it was determined that the attack had resulted in a severed jugular vein, two collapsed lungs, a kidney laceration, and severed tendons in her knees and thumb. Fortunately, Boroski's baby survived, although not without complications; Boroski's daughter would later be diagnosed with mild cerebral palsy. Boroski was able to provide authorities with a composite sketch and the first three characters of the attacker's license plate. However, the killings ceased following the Boroski attack and the case became cold.

Suspects

Delbert Tallman
On May 20, 1984, 16-year-old Heidi Martin went for a jog in Hartland, Vermont, on Martinsville Road. The next day, her body was found in a swampy area behind Hartland Elementary School. She had been raped and stabbed to death. 21-year-old Delbert C. Tallman confessed to the crime and was tried; however, he later recanted his confession and was acquitted. Nearly three years later, Agnew's body would be found approximately a mile from where Martin was discovered.

Tallman has resided in Bellows Falls, Springfield, and Windsor, Vermont, as well as Claremont, New Hampshire, the epicenter of most of the Connecticut River Valley Killings. He was convicted in 1996 on two counts of lewd and lascivious conduct with a child and was incarcerated at Lake County prison in Florida for failure to comply with sex offender registration requirements. He was released from prison on October 6, 2010.

Given the circumstances of Martin's murder, and the dearth of information related to the arrest and trial of a suspect, some sources cite Martin's death as unsolved and part of the killings. There is, however, no evidence presently available to the public that Tallman was involved in any of the other cases.

Gary Westover's deathbed confession
In October 1997, a 46-year-old Grafton, New Hampshire, paraplegic named Gary Westover relayed to his uncle, retired Grafton County sheriff's deputy Howard Minnon, that he had a confession. He was a paraplegic and wheelchair bound. Westover told Minnon that he was forced to participate in Barbara's murder. In 1987, according to his confession, three of his friends picked him up on the day of Barbara's murder for a "night of partying." Allegedly, they loaded Westover and his wheelchair into their van and set out to Vermont, where they abducted, murdered, and dumped Agnew off a back road, the Connecticut River Valley Killer's final victim. They then took him back to his home. Westover provided the names of the three friends. Thereafter, Minnon shared Westover's information with his wife, daughter, and law enforcement. However, Minnon felt that authorities were not interested in his information. Westover died in March 1998, and Minnon died in 2006.

In August 2006, after deceased murderer and suspected serial killer Michael Andrew Nicholaou was identified as a potential suspect, one of Westover's aunts wrote to Anne Agnew, sister of the victim, with the information originally given by Westover to Minnon. Agnew forwarded the letter to Carty, who suspected that Westover had been used as "bait" to get Barbara to pull over in the rest stop. She believes that Nicholaou was one of the men named in Westover's confession. However, this has not been confirmed. She subsequently ran Nicholaou's name by Westover's aunt, who stated that the named "sounded familiar." Carty believes that authorities are in possession of the names Westover provided to Minnon, and further speculated that Westover may have become acquainted with Nicholaou at a local Virginia hospital, although none of this has been confirmed and the Connecticut River Valley Killings remain unsolved.

Other possible victims
Joanne Dunham, 14, was sexually assaulted and strangled on June 11, 1968, in Charlestown, New Hampshire, and has been tangentially linked to the canonical killings on the basis of geographic proximity. On October 5, 1982, 76-year-old Sylvia Gray was found bludgeoned and stabbed to death in a wooded area, a few hundred yards from her home in Plainfield, New Hampshire, a day after having been reported missing. 38-year-old Steven Hill was last seen on June 20, 1986, retrieving his paycheck from his Lebanon, New Hampshire employer. On July 15, Hill's body was found with multiple stab wounds in Hartland, across the Connecticut River from where Gray's body had been found four years earlier.

On June 24, 1989, decomposed body parts consisting of arms and legs belonging to a woman were found dumped alongside Massachusetts Route 78 in Warwick, Massachusetts, less than a mile from the New Hampshire border. The entire body was believed to have been dismembered. The head and torso were never found and are believed to have been disposed of elsewhere. Investigators ruled the death a homicide. The victim was described as white, average height, with an athletic type body. The woman's identity is still unknown and the homicide remains unsolved. On July 25, 1989, 14-year-old Carrie Moss of New Boston, New Hampshire, left her parents' home to visit friends in Goffstown and disappeared. Almost exactly two years later, on July 24, 1991, her skeletal remains were found in a wooded area in New Boston. While her cause of death could not be determined, she was thought to be the victim of a homicide.

See also 
List of fugitives from justice who disappeared
List of serial killers in the United States

References

External links

New Hampshire Cold Cases
Vermont Cold Cases
New England Unsolved: The Valley Killer'' 
Shadow Death Connecticut Valley Killer
Connecticut River Valley Crimes

1978 murders in the United States
American murderers of children
American rapists
American serial killers
Crimes in New Hampshire
Crimes in Vermont
Fugitives
History of women in New Hampshire
Murder in New Hampshire
Murder in Vermont
Sexual assaults in the United States
Unidentified serial killers
Unsolved murders in the United States
Women in Vermont